Paul Cahillane (born 4 March 1989) is a Gaelic footballer from County Laois.

An under-17 and under-19 Republic of Ireland soccer international player, Cahillane played with Celtic F.C. from 2005 until 2008. He won the SPL Youth League and Youth cup in 2006 and won the SPL Reserve League a year later in 2007. This came after three years at the Dublin schoolboys team, Belvedere FC. He returned to Ireland in 2008 and played in the League of Ireland with UCD Reserves and Wexford.

However, he is probably better known as a Gaelic football player having won ten Laois Senior Football Championship medals with Portlaoise from  2009-2015 and 2017-2019.
He also won five ACL Division 1 titles in 2009, 2011, 2012, 2014 and 2019. He was part of the Portlaoise team that won the Leinster Senior Club Championship in 2009.

Cahillane was named Leinster Senior Club Footballer of the Year in 2009 and Laois Senior Footballer of the year in 2014.

Cahillane also played 8 seasons with the Laois Senior Football team and achieved AFL Division 4 promotion in 2018 and AFL Division 3 promotion in 2019.

References

1989 births
Living people
Portlaoise Gaelic footballers
Laois inter-county Gaelic footballers